Dustin Maldonado Antelo (born March 18, 1990) is a Bolivian  footballer  defender who currently plays for Universitario de Sucre in the Liga de Fútbol Profesional Boliviano.

International career
He was named in Bolivia's senior squad for a 2018 FIFA World Cup qualifier against Colombia in March 2016.

Club career statistics

References

External links
 
 Player profile Soccerpunter

1990 births
Living people
Sportspeople from Santa Cruz de la Sierra
Association football defenders
Bolivian footballers
Club Blooming players
Nacional Potosí players
Club Real Potosí players